
Gmina Różan is an urban-rural gmina (administrative district) in Maków County, Masovian Voivodeship, in east-central Poland.

Villages
Apart from the town of Różan, Gmina Różan contains the villages and settlements of Chełsty, Chrzczonki, Dąbrówka, Dyszobaba, Dzbądz, Kaszewiec, Miłony, Mroczki-Rębiszewo, Podborze, Prycanowo, Szygi, Załęże Wielkie, Załęże-Eliasze, Załęże-Gartki, Załęże-Sędzięta, Załuzie and Zawady-Ponikiew.

Neighbouring gminas
Gmina Różan is bordered by the gminas of Czerwonka, Goworowo, Młynarze and Rzewnie.

References

Polish official population figures 2006

Rozan
Maków County